The Women's 100 metre backstroke S12 event at the 2020 Paralympic Games took place on 27 August 2021, at the Tokyo Aquatics Centre.

Final
17:06 27 August 2021:

References

Swimming at the 2020 Summer Paralympics
2021 in women's swimming